A rubber mask is a mask made of rubber.  Typically, these are made of latex or silicone rubber and designed to be pulled over the head as a form of theatrical makeup or disguise.

The theatrical makeup used by Michael Crawford when he played the Phantom of the Opera started with a latex skullcap.  More latex strips were then added for the disfigured face.  The latex was then covered and coloured with cosmetics for the full effect.

See also

 Guy Fawkes mask
 Horse head mask
 List of crimes involving a silicone mask

References

Masks by material